The American Elm cultivar Ulmus americana 'L'Assomption' was selected from seedlings grown from X-irradiated seed at the eponymous experimental station in Quebec before 1965.

Description
'L'Assomption' is a very slow-growing tree.

Pests and diseases
The tree is highly resistant to Dutch elm disease. No other specific information is available, but the species as a whole is highly susceptible to Elm Yellows; it is also moderately preferred for feeding and reproduction by the adult Elm Leaf Beetle Xanthogaleruca luteola, and highly preferred for feeding by the Japanese Beetle Popillia japonica  in the United States.
U. americana is also the most susceptible of all the elms to verticillium wilt.

Cultivation
The tree is not known to be in cultivation beyond Canada.

Accessions

North America

Morden Arboretum, Morden, Canada. Two trees received 1970 from the Forest Research Laboratory in Sillary, Quebec. Acc. no. 65-0328

References

American elm cultivar
Ulmus articles missing images
Ulmus